Ulvibacter litoralis is a Gram-negative, aerobic, heterotrophic and non-motile bacterium from the genus of Ulvibacter which has been isolated from the alga Ulva fenestrata.

References

Flavobacteria
Bacteria described in 2004